Grodno  (1947-2010: Jaromin)  is a coastal place on the island of Wolin, in the administrative district of Gmina Międzyzdroje, within Kamień County, West Pomeranian Voivodeship, in north-western Poland.

There are two vacation centres at Grodno, Grodno I (formerly a vacation centre for the Polish government, given to the Wolin National Park on 10 February 2009), and Grodno II, a vacation centre within the National Park with its own beach.

To the south-east of Grodno is Gardno Lake.

See also
History of Pomerania

References

Grodno